William Camidge F.R.H.S. (1828-1909)  was a British solicitor and author based in York.
He wrote histories of Methodism and a biography of the painter William Etty.  He was a Royal Historical Society, and a Primitive Methodist associated with Elmfield College.

Works
Among his publications are the following:
1893: The Life of Richard Naylor ... the last of the York Corporation Bellmen.
1908: Old local customs
1893: Ye old streete of Pavemente, York, etc.
1899: The Poet-Painter of York, William Etty, R. A. [With a portrait]
1896: York and its dukedom
1886: York Savings Bank. Its history, formation, and growth.
  Bedern and its chapel.
  Trades and tradesmen of the city of York.
  William Etty: the poet-painter
  A memorial of the late Mr John Webster.
  Bygone Yorkshire / edited by William Andrews.
  Centenary Chapel.
  Clifford's Tower, York: its history, age and use.
  Copmanthorpe: introduction of Methodism into the village.
  History of the Methodist New Connexion in York.
  In memoriam: Mr John Francis Taylor.
  In memoriam: Rev. Joshua Haigh; a tribute from his old friend Wm Camidge.
  In memoriam: Robert Woodruffe Holmes; a tribute of respect by.
  In memoriam: to the memory of Mr Johnson Frank, late of George Street, York.
  In memorian: Mr Henry Crossfield; a tribute from his old friend Mr Wm Camidge.
  In memorian: Mr Joseph Bass.
  In memorian: sketch of Mr Robert Robson Letby, given at the memorial service in Melbourne Terrace chapel ... Dec. 22nd, 1897; by.
  Jonathan Martin, the incendiary: his life, wanderings, and peculiar ideas. With some particulars of the fire at York Minster in February, 1829.
  Jonathan Martin, the incendiary.
  Lady Huntingdon's chapel, College Street, York.
  Methodism in Bishopthorpe : introduction and development /.
  Methodism in Fulford /.
  Methodism in Huntington.
  Methodism in Nun Monkton: its introduction and development.
  Methodism in York.
  Mother Shipton, the Yorkshire sybil: her life, character and reputed sayings.
  Old local customs: a review of the habits and doings of State, Church, Law and Festivals.
  Ouse Bridge to Naburn Lock / by.
  Peter Prison and the old bridges of the Ouse in the city of York / by Wm Camidge.
  Primitive Methodism: its introduction and development in the city of York.
  Ramparts, bars, and walls of York.
  Richard Naylor, otherwise Dicky Naylor, the last of the York Corporation bellmen.
  Rufforth in the Ainsty of the city of York: its ancient & modern history.
  Rufforth, in the ainsty of the city of York: its ancient & modern history.
  The Bedern or Bederne and its chapel: the home of the Vicars Choral of York Minster.
  The ghosts of York.
  The Guild Hall at York, with particulars of its stained glass windows.
  The guilds of York: the inception, growth, purpose & influence of the two surviving guilds, Merchant Adventurers and Merchant Taylors.
  The Life and character of Harry Rowe, trumpet major and high-sheriff's trumpeter for the county of York. On Harry Rowe.
  The life and labours of Mr Thomas Gent, historian and printer.
  The life and peculiarities of Lumley Kettlewell, the York recluse.
  The life of Richard Naylor, otherwise Dickey Naylor, the last of the York Corporation bellmen / by Wm Camidge.
  The life, times and crime of Guye Fawkes, the conspirator.
  The Mansion House at York, with particulars of its pictures and silver.
  The poet-painter of York: William Etty.
  Wesley Chapel, Priory Street / by W. Camidge.
  Wesleyan Methodist Conference, York, 1908; July 15–29. (165th yearly conference, held at Centenary Chapel, York.) Official programme... Compiled... by H.E. Harrowell. (- Methodism in York, by Wm Camidge.).
  William Etty, R.A., the poet-painter.
  Ye old streete of pavemente (York) / by W. Camidge.
  York : its ramparts, bars, and walls / by Wm Camidge.
  York and its dukedom.
  York Castle: criminal and other records; [comp. by?].
  York Ragged School: its inception and development.
  York Savings' Bank : Its history, formation, and growth / by, Secretary, York Savings' Bank.
  York Wesleyan Methodist Juvenile Missionary Society: history of its birth and growth.
  York, sixty years ago: a retrospect.
  York: as a war centre.
  York: Its Ramparts, Bars and Walls /, F.R.H.S.
  York: Parliamentary, Old time elections.

His papers are at York City Archives.

Notes

External links
WorldCat page

1828 births
1909 deaths
Fellows of the Royal Historical Society
British solicitors
British Methodists